The 2010 season was the Hawthorn Football Club's 86th season in the Australian Football League and 109th overall.

Playing list changes 
The following lists all player changes between the conclusion of the 2009 season and the beginning of the 2010 season.

Trades

Draft

AFL draft

Rookie draft

Retirements and delistings

2010 player squad

Fixture

NAB Cup

Premiership season

Ladder

Finals series

References

External links
 Official website of the Hawthorn Football Club
 Official website of the Australian Football League 

2010 in Australian rules football
2010
2010 Australian Football League season